The  was a railway line most recently operated by Hokkaidō Chihoku Kōgen Railway Company in Hokkaidō, Japan. The  line connected the municipalities of Ikeda and Kitami until its closure in 2006.

History 
The line was then extended further north, and on September 25, 1911, the segment connecting Rikunbetsu and Nokkeushi (present-day ) was opened.

Once the Sekihoku Line was extended to Nokkeushi in 1932, traffic largely shifted to the shorter Sekihoku Line.

In 1987 Japanese National Railways (JNR), the successor to Japanese Government Railways, was privatized and JR Hokkaido took over management of the line. However, on June 4, 1989, JR Hokkaido ceased operation of the Chihoku Line. Unlike all other lines shut down by JNR and JR Hokkaido, in the Chihoku Line's case a successor company was established by local governments and private investors. The new company, Hokkaidō Chihoku Kōgen Railway Company, renamed the Chihoku Line to the Furusato Ginga Line ("Hometown Galaxy Line") and introduced new cars. However 17 years later, the company came to the decision to close the line, which thus ceased operations on April 21, 2006.

Stations

References

External links

Rail transport in Hokkaido
Defunct railway companies of Japan
1067 mm gauge railways in Japan
Railway lines opened in 1910
Railway lines closed in 2006
Defunct railroads